Malena Ivanova Andonova (born 6 July 1957) is a Bulgarian former sprinter. She competed in the women's 400 metres at the 1980 Summer Olympics.

References

External links
 

1957 births
Living people
Athletes (track and field) at the 1980 Summer Olympics
Bulgarian female sprinters
Olympic athletes of Bulgaria
Olympic female sprinters